BC Spartak Primorye is a Russian professional basketball club that is based in Vladivostok, Russia. It currently plays in the Russian Super League 1.

Players

Current roster

Notable players

 Victor Keyru: (2006–07)
 Nikolay Padius: (2008–09, 2012–13)
 Tomas Nagys: (2005–06)
 Vidas Ginevičius: (2007–09)
 Nikola Jestratijević: (2005–06)
 Torraye Braggs: (2005–06)
/ Willie Deane: (2005–07)
 Derrick Phelps: (2006–07)
/ J. R. Bremer: (2007–08)
 Joseph Blair: (2007–08)

Honours
Russian Basketball Super League 1
Winners (3): 2004-05, 2010–11, 2017–18

European record

Notes

External links
 Official website 
 Eurobasket.com Team Profile

Basketball teams in Russia
Sports clubs in Vladivostok
Basketball teams established in 1999
1999 establishments in Russia
Basketball teams disestablished in 2020